The Medical Arts Building is an office building in Montreal, Quebec, Canada. Its address is 1538 Sherbrooke Street West at the corner of Guy Street in the Golden Square Mile neighbourhood of Downtown Montreal. It is 11 stories and 45.17 m tall.

It was designed by Montreal architects Ross and Macdonald and is considered to be Renaissance Revival architecture. It was completed in 1923. Its structure is steel and its facade is mostly brick, with limestone at the base as well as the upper floors of the building.

The Medical Arts Building will be renovated as part of a 32 floor Waldorf-Astoria Hotel and luxury condominium development on the adjacent parking lots. The city says that the renovations done to the building will respect its architectural character.

References

External links
 1538 MONIT - 1538 Sherbrooke W.

Buildings and structures in Montreal
Downtown Montreal
Office buildings completed in 1923
Office buildings in Canada
Renaissance Revival architecture in Canada
Ross and Macdonald buildings